Smoking is the process of flavoring, browning, cooking, or preserving food by exposing it to smoke from burning or smoldering material, most often wood. Meat, fish, and lapsang souchong tea are often smoked.

In Europe, alder is the traditional smoking wood, but oak is more often used now, and beech to a lesser extent. In North America, hickory, mesquite, oak, pecan, alder, maple, and fruit-tree woods, such as apple, cherry, and plum, are commonly used for smoking. Other biomass besides wood can also be employed, sometimes with the addition of flavoring ingredients. Chinese tea-smoking uses a mixture of uncooked rice, sugar, and tea, heated at the base of a wok.

Some North American ham and bacon makers smoke their products over burning corncobs. Peat is burned to dry and smoke the barley malt used to make Scotch whisky and some beers. In New Zealand, sawdust from the native manuka (tea tree) is commonly used for hot smoking fish. In Iceland, dried sheep dung is used to cold-smoke fish, lamb, mutton and whale.

Historically, farms in the Western world included a small building termed the "smokehouse", where meats could be smoked and stored. This was generally well separated from other buildings both because of the fire danger and because of the smoke emanations; the smoking of food could possibly introduce polycyclic aromatic hydrocarbons which may lead to an increased risk of some types of cancer; however, this association is still being debated.

Smoking can be done in four ways: cold smoking, warm smoking, hot smoking, and through the employment of a smoke flavoring, such as liquid smoke. However, these methods of imparting smoke only affect the food surface, and are unable to preserve food, thus, smoking is paired with other microbial hurdles, such as chilling and packaging, to extend food shelf-life.

History 
The smoking of food likely dates back to the paleolithic era. As simple dwellings lacked chimneys, these structures would probably have become very smoky. It is supposed that early humans would hang meat up to dry and out of the way of pests, thus accidentally becoming aware that meat that was stored in smoky areas acquired a different flavor, and was better preserved than meat that simply dried out. This process was later combined with pre-curing the food in salt or salty brine, resulting in a remarkably effective preservation process that was adapted and developed by numerous cultures around the world. Until the modern era, smoking was of a more "heavy duty" nature as the main goal was to preserve the food. Large quantities of salt were used in the curing process and smoking times were quite long, sometimes involving days of exposure.

The advent of modern transportation made it easier to transport food products over long distances and the need for the time and material intensive heavy salting and smoking declined. Smoking became more of a way to flavor than to preserve food. In 1939 a device called the Torry Kiln was invented at the Torry Research Station in Scotland. The kiln allowed for uniform mass-smoking and is considered the prototype for all modern large-scale commercial smokers. Although refinements in technique and advancements in technology have made smoking much easier, the basic steps involved remain essentially the same today as they were hundreds if not thousands of years ago.

by method of application

Cold smoking 
Cold smoking differs from hot smoking in that the food remains raw, rather than cooked, throughout the smoking process. In this temperature range, foods take on a smoked flavor, but remain relatively moist. Cold smoking does not cook foods, and as such, meats should be fully cured before cold smoking. Cold smoking can be used as a flavor enhancer for items such as cheese or nuts, along with meats such as chicken breasts, beef, pork chops, salmon, scallops, and steak. The item is often hung in a dry environment first to develop a pellicle; it can then be cold smoked up to several days to ensure it absorbs the smoke flavor. Some cold smoked foods are baked, grilled, steamed, roasted, or sautéed before eating.

Cold smoking meats is not something that should be attempted at home, according to the US National Center for Home Food Preservation: "Most food scientists cannot recommend cold-smoking methods because of the inherent risks."

Cold smoking meats should only be attempted by personnel certified in HACCP [...] to ensure that it is safely prepared.

Warm smoking 

Hot smoking 
Hot smoking exposes the foods to smoke and heat in a controlled environment such as a smoker oven or smokehouse. Hot smoking requires the use of a smoker which generates heat either from a charcoal base, heated element within the smoker or from a stove-top or oven; food is hot smoked by cooking and flavored with wood smoke simultaneously. Like cold smoking, the item may be hung first to develop a pellicle; it is then smoked from 1 hour to as long as 24 hours. Although foods that have been hot smoked are often reheated or further cooked, they are typically safe to eat without further cooking. Hams and ham hocks are fully cooked once they are properly smoked, and they can be eaten as is without any further preparation. When food is smoked within this temperature range, foods are fully cooked, moist, and flavorful. Smoking at high temperatures also reduces yield, as both moisture and fat are cooked away.

Liquid smoke 
Liquid smoke, a product derived from smoke compounds in water, is applied to foods through spraying or dipping.

Smoke roasting 
Smoke-roasting refers to any process that has the attributes of both roasting and smoking. This smoking method is sometimes referred to as barbecuing or pit-roasting. It may be done in a smoke-roaster, a closed wood-fired oven, or a barbecue pit, any smoker that can reach above , or in a conventional oven by placing a pan filled with hardwood chips on the floor of the oven so that the chips can smolder and produce a smoke-bath. In North America, this smoking method is commonly referred to as "barbecuing", "pit baking", or "pit roasting".

Types by biomass

Wood smoke 

Hardwoods are made up mostly of three materials: cellulose, hemicellulose, and lignin. Cellulose and hemicellulose are the basic structural material of the wood cells; lignin acts as a kind of cell-bonding glue. Some softwoods, especially pines and firs, hold significant quantities of resin, which produces a harsh-tasting soot when burned; these woods are not often used for smoking.

Cellulose and hemicellulose are aggregate sugar molecules; when burnt, they effectively caramelize, producing carbonyls, which provide most of the color components and sweet, flowery, and fruity aromas. Lignin, a highly complex arrangement of interlocked phenolic molecules, also produces a number of distinctive aromatic elements when burnt, including smoky, spicy, and pungent compounds such as guaiacol, phenol, and syringol, and sweeter scents such as the vanilla-scented vanillin and clove-like isoeugenol. Guaiacol is the phenolic compound most responsible for the "smoky" taste, while syringol is the primary contributor to smoky aroma. Wood also contains small quantities of proteins, which contribute roasted flavors. Many of the odor compounds in wood smoke, especially the phenolic compounds, are unstable, dissipating after a few weeks or months.

A number of wood smoke compounds act as preservatives. Phenol and other phenolic compounds in wood smoke are both antioxidants, which slow rancidification of animal fats, and antimicrobials, which slow bacterial growth. Other antimicrobials in wood smoke include formaldehyde, acetic acid, and other organic acids, which give wood smoke a low pH—about 2.5. Some of these compounds are toxic to people as well, and may have health effects in the quantities found in cooking applications.

Since different species of trees have different ratios of components, various types of wood do impart a different flavor to food. Another important factor is the temperature at which the wood burns. High-temperature fires see the flavor molecules broken down further into unpleasant or flavorless compounds. This is the temperature of the burning wood itself, not of the smoking environment, which uses much lower temperatures. Woods that are high in lignin content tend to burn hot; to keep them smoldering requires restricted oxygen supplies or a high moisture content. When smoking using wood chips or chunks, the combustion temperature is often raised by soaking the pieces in water before placing them on a fire.

Types of smokers

Offset 

The main characteristics of the offset smoker are that the cooking chamber is usually cylindrical in shape, with a shorter, smaller diameter cylinder attached to the bottom of one end for a firebox. To cook the meat, a small fire is lit in the firebox, where airflow is tightly controlled. The heat and smoke from the fire are drawn through a connecting pipe or opening into the cooking chamber.

The heat and smoke cook and flavor the meat before escaping through an exhaust vent at the opposite end of the cooking chamber. Most manufacturers' models are based on this simple but effective design, and this is what most people picture when they think of a "BBQ smoker". Even large capacity commercial units use this same basic design of a separate, smaller fire box and a larger cooking chamber.

Upright drum 

The upright drum smoker (also referred to as an ugly drum smoker or UDS) is exactly what its name suggests; an upright steel drum that has been modified for the purpose of pseudo-indirect hot smoking. There are many ways to accomplish this, but the basics include the use of a complete steel drum, a basket to hold charcoal near the bottom, and cooking rack (or racks) near the top; all covered by a vented lid of some sort.

This design is similar to smoking with indirect heat due to the distance from the coals and the racks, which is typically . The temperatures used for smoking are controlled by limiting the amount of air intake at the bottom of the drum, and allowing a similar amount of exhaust out of vents in the lid. UDSs are very efficient with fuel consumption and flexible in their abilities to produce proper smoking conditions, with or without the use of a water pan or drip pan.

Vertical water 

A vertical water smoker (also referred to as a bullet smoker because of its shape) is a variation of the upright drum smoker. It uses charcoal or wood to generate smoke and heat, and contains a water bowl between the fire and the cooking grates. The water bowl serves to maintain optimal smoking temperatures and also adds humidity to the smoke chamber. It also creates an effect in which the water vapor and smoke condense together, which adds flavor to smoked foods. In addition, the bowl catches any drippings from the meat that may cause a flare-up. Vertical water smokers are extremely temperature stable and require very little adjustment once the desired temperature has been reached. Because of their relatively low cost and stable temperature, they are sometimes used in barbecue competitions where propane and electric smokers are not allowed.

Propane 

A propane smoker is designed to allow the smoking of meat in a somewhat more temperature controlled environment. The primary differences are the sources of heat and of the smoke. In a propane smoker, the heat is generated by a gas burner directly under a steel or iron box containing the wood or charcoal that provides the smoke. The steel box has few vent holes, on the top of the box only. By starving the heated wood of oxygen, it smokes instead of burning. Any combination of woods and charcoal may used. This method uses much less wood but does require propane fuel.

Smoke box 
This more traditional method uses a two-box system: a fire box and a food box. The fire box is typically adjacent or under the cooking box, and can be controlled to a finer degree. The heat and smoke from the fire box exhausts into the food box, where it is used to cook and smoke the meat. These may be as simple as an electric heating element with a pan of wood chips placed on it, although more advanced models have finer temperature controls.

Electric smokers 
The most convenient of the various types of smokers are the insulated electric smokers. Although wood chunks, pellets, and even in some cases automatically fed wood pucks are used to generate smoke, the amount of flavor obtained is less than traditional wood or charcoal smokers.

Trench 

In this method the firebox is a narrow trench cut down a slope pointing into the prevailing wind. The middle part of the trench is covered over to make it into a tunnel. At the upper end of the trench is a vertical framework covered to form a chimney within which is placed the rack of foodstuff. At the lower upwind end of the trench is lit a small smokey fire, and sustained day and night until the foodstuff is cured.

Commercial smokehouse 
Commercial smokehouses, mostly made from stainless steel, have independent systems for smoke generation and cooking. Smoke generators use friction, an electric coil or a small flame to ignite sawdust on demand. Heat from steam coils or gas flames is balanced with live steam or water sprays to control the temperature and humidity. Elaborate air handling systems reduce hot or cold spots, to reduce variation in the finished product. Racks on wheels or rails are used to hold the product and facilitate movement.

Pellet smokers 
A pellet smoker is a temperature controlled smoker that burns wood pellets made of dried out sawdust, about an inch long and 1/4 inch wide. The wood pellets are stored in a gravity-fed hopper that feeds into a motor controlled auger by the temperature regulator. This auger pushes the pellets into the fire pot. An ignition rod within the auger ignites the pellets where a combustion fan keeps them smouldering. The motor and the combustion fan regulate the temperature of the smoker by feeding it more pellets and increasing airflow in the auger. Above the auger is a heat shield to disperse the direct heat before it reaches the heat box to allow the wood smoke to keep the heat box at an even temperature throughout. The heat sensor inside the heat box relays the current temperature inside the box back to the temperature regulator that controls the fan speed and pellet hopper motor, which either increase or decrease the amount of pellets in the auger or the amount of air available to the fire to maintain the desired temperature for the cook.

The popularity of this type of smokers is on the rise after many BBQ pit-masters started using them for competition barbeque.

Preservation 

Smoke is both an antimicrobial and antioxidant, however it is insufficient alone for preserving food as smoke does not penetrate far into meat or fish; it is thus typically combined with salt-curing or drying.

Smoking is especially useful for oily fish, as its antioxidant properties inhibit surface fat rancidification and delay interior fat exposure to degrading oxygen. Some heavily salted, long-smoked fish can keep without refrigeration for weeks or months.

Artificial smoke flavoring (such as liquid smoke) can be purchased to mimic smoking's flavor, but not its preservative qualities.

Competitive smoking 
Competition BBQ Smoking is becoming increasingly popular among smoking enthusiasts, especially in the Southern American States, where BBQ enthusiasts come together over a weekend to cook various cuts of meat such as a whole hog or beef brisket to become the best at BBQ.

Organisations such as Kansas City Barbeque Society run competitions all over America.

Health concerns 

Regularly consuming smoked meats and fish may increase the risk of several types of cancer and cardiovascular disease.

List of smoked foods and beverages 

Some of the more common smoked foods and beverages include:
 Beverages
Lapsang souchong tea leaves are smoked and dried over pine or cedar fires
Malt beverages
The malt used to make whisky
Rauchbier (smoked beer)

Fruit and vegetables
Capsicums: chipotles (smoked, ripe jalapeños), paprika
Prunes (dried plums) can be smoked while drying
Wumei are smoked plum fruits
Iburi-gakko are a smoked daikon pickle from Akita Prefecture, Japan

Meat, fish, and cheese
Beef
Pastrami (pickled, spiced and smoked beef brisket)
Pork
Bacon
Ham
Bakkwa
Turkey
Chicken
Sausage
Salami
Jerky
Fish
Eel popular in eastern/northern Europe
Traditional Grimsby smoked fish (cod and haddock)
Haddock and Arbroath smokies (haddock)
Buckling, kippers and bloater (herring)
Salmon
Mackerel
Bivalves including oysters and mussels.
Egg (eggs and fish eggs)
Cheese
Adyghe Qwaye (Circassian)
Gouda
Gruyère
Other proteins
Nuts
Tofu

Spices
Paprika
Salt

See also 

 Braising
 Canning
 Drying
 Jerky
 List of dried foods
 List of sausage dishes
 List of sausages
 List of smoked foods
 Smoked fish
 Smoked meat

References

Further reading

External links 

 
Barbecue
Cooking techniques
Food preservation
Culinary terminology